James Lewis Perry (born 19 November 1979 in Cape Town) is a South African former professional road cyclist. Perry has previously ridden for the UCI Professional Continental team Barloworld until the team's demise. In 2001 he won a bronze medal at the World Under 23 Time Trial Championship. He has been a professional since 2002. He won the Time Trial at the South African Championships in 2002, and also came second in 2007.

He also won the Grand Prix Möbel Alvisse in 2005, while riding for the Konica Minolta team.

Major results

2000
 1st  Criterium, National Road Championships
 2nd Road race, National Under–23 Road Championships
2001
 3rd  Time trial, Under–23 World Road Championships
2002
 1st  Time trial, National Road Championships
2005
 1st GP Möbel Alvisse
 2nd Overall Ringerike GP
 2nd Powerade Dome 2 Dome Cycling Spectacular
 2nd Flèche Ardennaise
 4th Overall Flèche du Sud
 5th Road race, National Road Championships
 7th Overall Tour of Japan
2007
 2nd Time trial, National Road Championships
2008
 1st  Time trial, National Road Championships
2009
 3rd Time trial, National Road Championships
2010
 National Road Championships
2nd Time trial
3rd Road race
2011
 National Track Championships
1st  Individual pursuit
1st  Team pursuit
2012
 1st  Individual pursuit, National Track Championships
2013
 1st  Team pursuit, National Track Championships
 10th Overall Mzansi Tour
2014
 5th Time trial, National Road Championships

References

Profile at Barloworld official website

South African male cyclists
1979 births
Living people
Sportspeople from Cape Town
White South African people